Cyrus William "C.W." Melson (July 9, 1929 – June 19, 1981) was a Republican member of the Arkansas House of Representatives from the unincorporated Ozone community in Johnson County in northwestern Arkansas. He served from 1977 until his death in the office.

Melson is interred at the Airy Memorial Cemetery in Ludwig in Johnson County, Arkansas.

References

1929 births
1981 deaths
Republican Party members of the Arkansas House of Representatives
American Christian clergy
20th-century Christian clergy
Assemblies of God people
People from Johnson County, Arkansas
20th-century American politicians
Burials in Arkansas
20th-century American clergy